Ida Dwinger (born 6 March 1957) is a Danish actress.

She graduated from Odense Theater School in 1984.

Filmography

Movies 
 Open Hearts aka Dogme #28 (2002)
 Facing the Truth (2002)
 Reconstruction (2003)
 Princess (2006)
 Just Like Home (2007)
 Fighter (2007)
 Aching Hearts (2009)

TV-series
 Clown (2005) (episode 10)
 Better Times (2004-2006) (episodes 3, 5, 19)
 Sommer (2008) (episodes 1-10)

External links

1957 births
21st-century Danish actresses
Living people